Malchow is a German locality (Ortsteil) in the borough (Bezirk) of Lichtenberg, Berlin. Until 2001 it was part of the former Hohenschönhausen borough. With a population of 450 (2008) it is the least-populated Berliner Ortsteil.

History
The locality was first mentioned in 1344. Until 1920 it was an autonomous municipality merged into Berlin with the Greater Berlin Act. A former civil parish of it,  Stadtrandsiedlung Malchow, was divided from Malchow in 1985, becoming an Ortsteil of the former borough of Weißensee (still part of Pankow district in 2001).

Geography
Malchow is located in the north-eastern suburb of Berlin, and counts in its territory a little lake named Malchower See. It borders with the localities of Wartenberg, Neu-Hohenschönhausen and Stadtrandsiedlung Malchow.

Transport
The locality, crossed by the Außenring railway line, is not served by any station. The nearest Berlin S-Bahn stop is Wartenberg, on S75 line, that ends there. It has been projected to continue the S75 track in 2015 on the Außenring from Wartenberg to Karow, but a station for Malchow, hypothesized, is still not officially scheduled on the plan.

The village's main road, Malchower Dorfstraße, is part of the B2, the German longest federal highway.

Photogallery

References

External links

 Malchow page on www.berlin.de

Localities of Berlin

Populated places established in the 1340s